is a passenger railway station located in Nishi-ku, Kobe, Hyōgo Prefecture, Japan, operated by the private Kobe Electric Railway (Shintetsu).

Lines

Station layout
The station consists of two unnumbered ground-level side platforms connected by an elevated station building. The station is unattended.

Platforms

Adjacent stations

History
Kizu Station opened on April 27, 1937.  It was renamed  on October 1, 1952 but reverted to its original name on April 1, 1988.

Passenger statistics
In fiscal 2019, the station was used by an average of 607 passengers daily.

Surrounding area
 Kobe Techno Logistic Park
 Kensoninken Shrine

See also
List of railway stations in Japan

References

External links

 Official website (Kobe Electric Railway) 

Railway stations in Japan opened in 1937
Railway stations in Kobe